Libeled Lady is a 1936 screwball comedy film starring Jean Harlow, William Powell, Myrna Loy, and Spencer Tracy, written by George Oppenheimer, Howard Emmett Rogers, Wallace Sullivan, and Maurine Dallas Watkins, and directed by Jack Conway. This was the fifth of fourteen films in which Powell and Loy were teamed.

Libeled Lady was nominated for the Academy Award for Best Picture. The film was remade in 1946 as Easy to Wed with Esther Williams, Van Johnson, and Lucille Ball.

Plot
Wealthy Connie Allenbury is falsely accused of breaking up a marriage and sues the New York Evening Star newspaper for $5 million for libel. Warren Haggerty, the managing editor, turns in desperation to former reporter and suave ladies' man Bill Chandler for help. Bill's scheme is to maneuver Connie into being alone with him when his wife shows up, so that the suit will have to be dropped. Bill is not married, so Warren volunteers his long-suffering fiancée, Gladys Benton, to marry Bill in name only, over her loud protests.

Bill arranges to return to America from England on the same ocean liner as Connie and her father J. B. He pays some men to pose as reporters and harass Connie at the dock, so that he can "rescue" her and become acquainted. On the voyage, Connie initially treats him with contempt, assuming that he is just the latest in a long line of fortune hunters after her money, but Bill gradually overcomes her suspicions.

Complications arise when Connie and Bill actually fall in love. They get married, but Gladys decides that she prefers Bill to a marriage-averse newspaperman and interrupts their honeymoon to reclaim her husband. Bill reveals that he found out that Gladys was married before and that her Yucatán divorce was invalid, thus rendering their own marriage invalid. But Gladys reveals she got a second divorce in Reno, so she and Bill are legally man and wife. Connie and Bill manage to show Gladys that she really loves Warren.

Cast
  Jean Harlow as Gladys Benton
  William Powell as Bill Chandler
  Myrna Loy as Connie Allenbury
  Spencer Tracy as Warren Haggerty
  Walter Connolly as James B. Allenbury
 Charley Grapewin as Hollis Bane, Haggerty's boss
 Cora Witherspoon as Mrs. Burns-Norvell, a talkative acquaintance of the Allenburys
 E. E. Clive as Evans, a fishing instructor
 Bunny Beatty as Babs Burns-Norvell, Mrs. Burns-Norvell's daughter
 Otto Yamaoka as Ching
 Charles Trowbridge as Graham
 Spencer Charters as the Magistrate
 George Chandler as the Bellhop
 Billy Benedict as Johnny
 Gwen Lee as the switchboard operator

Cast notes
 Hattie McDaniel, who frequently played maids, makes a brief appearance as a hotel cleaner.

Production
The film went into production in mid-July 1936 and wrapped on September 1.  Location shooting took place in Sonora, California. Lionel Barrymore was originally cast as Mr. Allenbury, and Rosalind Russell was originally considered to play Connie Allenbury.

Harlow and Powell were an off-screen couple, and Harlow wanted to play Connie Allenbury, so that her character and Powell's wound up together. MGM insisted, however, that the film be another William Powell-Myrna Loy vehicle, as they originally intended. Harlow had already signed on to do the film but had to settle for the role of Gladys Benton. Nevertheless, as Gladys, top-billed Harlow got to play a wedding scene with Powell. During filming, Harlow changed her legal name from Harlean Carpenter McGrew Bern Rosson to Jean Harlow. She made only two more films before dying at the age of 26 in 1937.

It has been rumored that Loy and Tracy had an affair during the shooting of the film.

While he was making jokes about Arthur Hornblow Jr (who married Loy few weeks ago) saying "I hate Hornblow" table in the studio commissary reserved for men, Spencer Tracy had fun giving to Myrna Loy a good-natured hard time.

Two great passenger liners made cameos as the ship in the film, the SS Queen Anne: Cunard's venerable RMS Berengaria (in the pierside view) and France's beautiful SS Normandie in an aerial shot.

Reception
The film was released on 9 October 1936, and earned $2.7 million at the box office — $1,601,000 in the U.S. and Canada and $1,122,000 in other markets, resulting in a profit of $1,189,000.

It received an Academy Award nomination for 1936 Best Picture.

References

External links

 
 
 
 
 

1936 films
1930s screwball comedy films
American black-and-white films
American screwball comedy films
Films about journalists
Films directed by Jack Conway
Metro-Goldwyn-Mayer films
Films set in New York City
Films set in London
Seafaring films
1936 comedy films
1930s American films